This List of Negro league baseball players who played in Major League Baseball is largely based on the research compiled by the Center for Negro League Baseball Research.  The list includes those who played on major Negro league teams prior to integration (and any caliber Negro league team after integration) as well as in Major League Baseball.  The list does not include Negro league players who only played in the minor leagues and White Hispanic players who played in both the Negro Leagues and MLB prior to full integration (ex. Pedro Dibut).

Pre-integration players 

Major League Baseball was segregated from 1887 through 1946.  The integration of Major League Baseball happened at the beginning of the 1947 MLB season when Jackie Robinson played his first game for the Brooklyn Dodgers.  By the 1950s, enough black talent had integrated into the formerly "white" leagues (both major and minor) that the Negro leagues themselves had become a minor league circuit.

Below is a list of 52 players who played for major Negro league teams up to 1950 and eventually saw playing time for a Major League team.  Of these, nine have been inducted into the Baseball Hall of Fame and two of them (Greason and Mays) are still alive.

Notes

Post-integration players 

An additional 35 or so players played on a Negro league team after 1950.  A select few were All-Stars and one (Aaron) was inducted into the Hall of Fame.

 Charlie Neal
 Hank Aaron
 George Altman
 Maury Wills
 Donn Clendenon
 John Wyatt
 Blue Moon Odom
 Paul Casanova

See also 

 List of starting black NFL quarterbacks
 List of black NHL players

References 

 List of players: 
 Military service: 

First black Major League Baseball players by team and date
Major League Baseball
Negro league baseball players